Patriarch Meletius of Constantinople may refer to:

 Meletius II of Constantinople, Ecumenical Patriarch in 1769
 Meletius III of Constantinople, Ecumenical Patriarch in 1845
 Meletius IV of Constantinople, Ecumenical Patriarch in 1921–1923